Garattoni is a surname. Notable people with the surname include:

Alessandro Garattoni (born 1998), Italian footballer
Fabrizio Garattoni, Italian figure skater